Snow Moon Lake is located in Glacier National Park, in the U. S. state of Montana. The lake is in a cirque to the north of Allen Mountain and adjacent to Falling Leaf Lake.

See also
 List of lakes in Glacier County, Montana

References

Lakes of Glacier National Park (U.S.)
Lakes of Glacier County, Montana